The Benson & Hedges Trophy was a professional golf tournament that was held in Spain from 1988 to 1991. It was a mixed pairs event that was an unofficial money event on both the European Tour and Ladies European Tour.

The tournament was held in November, after the conclusion of the main Order of Merit schedule, at a different venue each year.

Winners

References

Former European Tour events
Former Ladies European Tour events
Golf tournaments in Spain
Team golf tournaments
Recurring sporting events established in 1988
Recurring sporting events disestablished in 1991